The National Museum of Brazil collections include an exhibition of mummies from South American and Egyptian civilizations.

The current status of the collection is unknown after the fire that destroyed the museum in 2018.

References